The Sentinel is a 1977 American supernatural horror film directed by Michael Winner, and starring Cristina Raines, Chris Sarandon, Ava Gardner, Burgess Meredith, Sylvia Miles, and Eli Wallach. The plot focuses on a young model who moves into a historic Brooklyn brownstone that has been sectioned into apartments, only to find that the building is owned by the Catholic diocese and is a gateway to Hell. It is based on the 1974 novel of the same name by Jeffrey Konvitz, who also co-wrote the screenplay with director Winner. It also features Christopher Walken, Jeff Goldblum, John Carradine, Jerry Orbach, Tom Berenger, Nana Visitor and Beverly D'Angelo in supporting roles.  

The film was released by Universal Pictures in 1977.

Plot
  
Alison Parker, a beautiful but neurotic fashion model with a history of suicide attempts, moves into a historic Brooklyn Heights brownstone that has been divided into apartments. The top floor apartment is occupied by a reclusive blind priest, Father Halliran, who spends his time sitting at his open window. Soon after moving in, Alison begins having strange physical problems, including fainting spells and insomnia, and hears strange noises from the apartment above hers. Alison meets her odd new neighbors, including the eccentric, elderly Charles Chazen, and attends a bizarre birthday party for Chazen's cat. Later, she visits the apartment of lesbian couple Gerde Engstrom and Sandra, and is disturbed when Sandra begins openly masturbating in front of her. When Alison complains to the rental agent Miss Logan about her neighbors, she is told that the building is occupied only by Halliran and her. Miss Logan proves this by showing Alison the various empty apartments, including ones Alison had recently visited and seen occupied. Alison's lawyer boyfriend Michael initially believes she is suffering paranoid delusions, but secretly contacts his corrupt detective friend Brenner to look into the situation.

Late one night, Brenner goes to Alison's building, while inside Alison is again awakened by strange noises, and encounters the animated, rotting corpse of her recently deceased abusive father in the stairwell. She escapes by stabbing him and, covered in blood, runs screaming into the street, arousing the whole neighborhood. Alison is hospitalized with a nervous breakdown, and two police detectives, Gatz and Rizzo, begin an investigation, uncovering that Michael’s former wife fell to her death after refusing to divorce Michael. Gatz and Rizzo suspect that Michael murdered her so that he could marry Alison. The detectives find no body in Alison's building, the blood on her matches her own blood type, and her father is confirmed to have died three weeks previously. However, they later find Brenner's stabbed body dumped elsewhere, and his blood type also matches the blood found on Alison, suggesting that Alison might have murdered him. Gatz and Rizzo also find that the people Alison claimed she saw at the cat's birthday party are all deceased murderers.

Alison, who now has the ability to read Latin words that no one else can see, visits a Catholic church and confesses her sins, including her past suicide attempts and her adultery with Michael, to Monsignor Franchino. Michael, now conducting his own investigation, contacts the Diocesan office about Father Halliran and is directed to Franchino. Franchino is evasive, so Michael breaks into the office that night and reads Halliran's file, which shows he is one of a series of priests and nuns who previously attempted suicide in lay life and then became clergy or nuns on the date of their predecessor's death. Alison is listed as the latest in the series, slated to take over as "Sister Teresa" starting the next day. Frightened, Michael leaves Alison in the care of her friend Jennifer while he goes to Alison's apartment building. There, Michael uncovers a secret plaque with the words “Abandon all hope, ye who enter here” before finally being confronted by Father Halliran, whose eyes are white, and tells him that the building is the gateway to Hell. Michael screams at Halliran and tries to strangle him, but is killed by Franchino.

Alison meanwhile escapes from Jennifer's apartment and goes to her own, where she is confronted by Chazen and grotesque, deformed minions of Hell, including the now-dead Michael, who indeed had hired Brenner to kill his wife. Michael and Chazen explain that Halliran is the Sentinel, who ensures that the demons do not escape from Hell. Halliran is nearing the end of his life, and Alison, with her history of suicide attempts, has been chosen as the new Sentinel in order to save her own soul. Chazen hands the distraught Alison a knife and tries to convince her to reject her task as the Sentinel, commit suicide and join Michael in Hell. Just as Alison is about to cut her wrist, the infirm Halliran enters bearing a large cross, supported by Franchino, who declares they will rescue Alison. As Halliran approaches the demonic horde, bearing the cross before him, Chazen commands them to stop him. Despite an intense struggle, with Halliran almost becoming overwhelmed, the demons eventually withdraw from Halliran and the cross, and Alison takes the cross from Halliran and sits in his chair, accepting her duty as the Sentinel and saving her soul. Defeated, an angry Chazen orders the demons back to Hell before disappearing himself. Franchino then guides a weak and withered Halliran out of the room, leaving Allison alone.

The brownstone is demolished and replaced with a modern apartment complex shortly after. Miss Logan shows an apartment to a young couple. The couple asks about the neighbors, and Miss Logan explains that there are only two: a violin player and a reclusive nun. Alison, now blind and dressed as a nun, sits facing out the top apartment window.

Cast

Production

Development
Universal Pictures purchased the film rights the novel in 1974 and originally hired its author Jeffrey Konvitz to write the screenplay. It later replaced Konvitz with Richard Alan Simmons as screenwriter and hired Don Siegel as director. Although location scouting for this version of the film was done in New Orleans in 1975, it was abandoned in favor of a screenplay co-written by Konvitz and the new director Michael Winner, who was offered the project by Universal executive Ned Tanen when the two met at a party in Los Angeles.

Casting
Winner cast Cristina Raines in the lead role of Alison Parker, having directed her previously in The Stone Killer (1973), though her scenes were ultimately cut from the finished version of that film. In the role of Michael Lerman, Alison's attorney boyfriend, Winner hired Martin Sheen, but Universal disagreed with this casting decision, as executive felt Sheen had "done too much television" and did not have a wide enough appeal to film audiences. As an alternative, Winner cast Chris Sarandon, whom he had been impressed by in his role in Dog Day Afternoon (1975) as well as several Broadway theatre productions. Sarandon later commented that he regretted accepting the role: "When I first read it, I thought it had a chance of being a first-rate picture. I liked the book a lot...  but I had no fun making it...  It was the only picture I've done that I felt was not a success on any level, personally or professionally."

A number of Golden Age Hollywood stars were cast in supporting roles, including Ava Gardner, Martin Balsam, John Carradine, José Ferrer, Arthur Kennedy, Eli Wallach, and Sylvia Miles. Christopher Walken was given a minor supporting role as a detective, while the film marked Beverly D'Angelo's first feature screen appearance; Winner later stated that he felt Walken and D'Angelo should have portrayed the lead roles of Alison and Michael. Richard Dreyfuss also appears in the film's final sequence in an uncredited role as an extra. 

Winner chose to cast Gardner in the role of the realtor, Miss Logan, because he felt "every time I rent an apartment in New York, I get it from a realtor who looks just like Ava. She keeps saying she's a lousy actress, but she's very good." After working with Gardner on the film, Winner became a lifelong friend of hers.

Filming
Principal photography began in New York City on May 21, 1976 with a budget of $3.5 million. The external views of the house were taken from the block built at the west end of Remsen Street in Brooklyn and many of the film's locations are in Brooklyn Heights.

Winner was visually inspired by the depictions of the creatures of Hell as they appear in the works of Christopher Marlowe, Dante's Inferno, and the paintings of Hieronymus Bosch. Shortly after the film's release, Winner revealed that many of the deformed persons featured in the finale were actually people with physical disabilities and abnormalities, whom he cast from hospitals and sideshows.

After the film's completion, Winner screened the final cut for Universal Pictures executives, whom he stated "almost committed suicide by doing a two-foot fall from their padded leather chairs."

Music
John Williams was originally hired to compose the film's score before being replaced with Gil Mellé.

Release

Box office
The Sentinel was released theatrically by Universal Pictures on February 11, 1977 and was a mild box-office success. It grossed a total of $4 million in the United States, and was the 57th highest-grossing film of the year.

Critical response

Contemporaneous
By director Winner's account, The Sentinel received reviews that were "on the whole, very good." Kevin Thomas praised the film's performances and entertainment value, but noted that it lacked originality, writing: "Whether intended or not, The Sentinel seems above all a parody of every chiller dealing with the supernatural from Rosemary's Baby through The Exorcist to The Omen. Indeed, the material is so derivative and therefore essentially unconvincing that it's hard to imagine how else it could have been played." Critic Peter Travers described the film as "one of those all-star movies featuring actors who give the impression of being in-between jobs... The shocking thing to me about The Sentinel is why actors such as Ferrer, Gardner, Kennedy, Meredith, Carradine, and Martin Balsam lend their names to it."

Variety gave the film a negative review, writing "The Sentinel is a grubby, grotesque excursion into religioso psychodrama, notable for uniformly poor performances by a large cast of familiar names and direction that is hysterical and heavy-handed." The New York Times called the film "dull", criticizing the film for its long stretches, but commended Raines' performance. John Simon of the National Review described The Sentinel as "dreadful". Film scholar Richard Bookbinder wrote in his 1982 book The Films of the Seventies the final sequence in which the "armies of Hell" terrorize Alison "is undoubtedly one of the most terrifying interludes in seventies cinema."

Modern
, The Sentinel holds an approval rating of 48% on the review aggregator Rotten Tomatoes based on 21 reviews, with a rating average of 6/10.
Anthony Arrigo from Dread Central gave the film 3.5 out of 5 stars, writing, "The Sentinel might be devoid of any big, memorable showstopper moments but it maintains enough of a chilling atmosphere to keep fright fans engaged." Brett Gallman from Oh, the Horror! gave the film a positive review, stating that, although it was not the best of the "demonic horror" subgenre, it was just as entertaining. Gallman also commended the film's script, performances and effective imagery.

David Pirie in Time Out was quite negative in his review, claiming The Sentinel was "just a mass of frequently incomprehensible footage, acted so badly that even the most blatant shocks count for little". Pirie criticised the movie for being derivative of Rosemary's Baby, The Exorcist and The Omen: "The Sentinel seems little more than a pile of outtakes from recent supernatural successes." Robin Wood described The Sentinel as "the worst—most offensive and repressive—horror film of the 70s". 

Ian Jane from DVD Talk awarded the film 3.5 out of 5 stars. In his conclusion Jane wrote, "Michael Winner's The Sentinel is a gleefully perverse slice of seventies horror that makes no qualms about taking things in a few entirely unexpected directions while still sticking to some tried and true genre conventions. It's not a perfect film but it's definitely interesting and always entertaining."
The film was ranked #46 on Bravo's 100 Scariest Movie Moments in 2004.

TV Guide awarded the film 1/5 stars, calling it "a truly repulsive film".  Jedd Beaudoin from PopMatters gave the film 1/10 stars, criticizing the film's lack of believability and incoherent plot.

Home media
The first home media release of this film was in 1985, under the MCA Home Video label. Universal Pictures Home Video released The Sentinel on DVD in 2004. In 2015, Scream Factory issued the film on Blu-ray with new bonus materials, including three audio commentaries.

References

Sources

External links
 
 
 
 
 
 

1977 films
1977 horror films
1970s ghost films
1970s supernatural horror films
American ghost films
American haunted house films
American supernatural horror films
1970s English-language films
Films about Catholicism
Films about suicide
Films directed by Michael Winner
Films based on American horror novels
Films set in apartment buildings
Films set in Baltimore
Films set in Brooklyn
Films set in hell
Films scored by Gil Mellé
Religious horror films
Universal Pictures films
Films with screenplays by Michael Winner
Demons in film
Films produced by Michael Winner
1970s American films